Trey Farley (born Jason Farley on 1 July 1975 in Manila, Philippines) is a TV producer/director and broadcaster, best known for presenting the BBC Children's Saturday flagship morning show Live & Kicking.

Early life
Farley's father is English and his mother Filipino. He studied Environmental Geoscience at University College London.

Presenting career
Farley has presented for Channel V Asia, MTV Europe as well as the British programmes Masters of Combat, Loves Like a Dog, Grandstand and Live & Kicking. He has also presented on The National Geographic Channel and The Discovery Channel. He began his career working for Mtv Asia  as producer, director and presenter. He also won an award for 'Most Innovative Presenter' at the Asian Television Awards.

He now hosts Cha$e on the Sci Fi Channel.

Acting
Farley has acted in various films including Bend It Like Beckham where he played Taz, Containment where he played Jacob, The Run, Martyr and Slow Fade. He has also appeared on stage in London.

Farley's most recent appearance on TV was in late 2014 on The Discovery Channel as broadcaster on the documentary special After The Megastorm about the aftermath of Typhoon Haiyan in his home country of the Philippines.

Personal life
He is married to fellow television presenter Katy Hill, whom he met whilst presenting Live & Kicking. They have a daughter - Kaya Sky, and a son - Akira Seven.

References

External links

1975 births
Living people
British VJs (media personalities)
English television presenters
Filipino television presenters
English people of Filipino descent
Filipino people of English descent
Alumni of University College London